The law of supply is a fundamental principle of economic theory which states that, keeping other factors constant, an increase in price results in an increase in quantity supplied. In other words, there is a direct relationship between price and quantity: quantities respond in the same direction as price changes. This means that producers are willing to offer more of a product for sale on the market at higher prices by increasing production as a way of increasing profits.

In short, the law of supply is a positive relationship between quantity supplied and price and is the reason for the upward slope of the supply curve.

Some heterodox economists, such as Steve Keen and Dirk Ehnts, dispute the law of supply, arguing that the supply curve for mass produced goods is often downward-sloping: as production increases, unit prices go down, and conversely, if demand is very low, unit prices go up. This corresponds to economies of scale.

Definition 

To know law of supply, we should know what is supply previously. Supply is the quantity of a good or service that producers are willing and able to provide at a given price, at a given time. [5] Law of supply is the microeconomic law explaining the characteristic of the supply, stating that

“ All other factors being equal, as the price of a good or service increases, the quantity of goods or services that suppliers offer will increase, and vice versa. The law of supply says that as the price of an item goes up, suppliers will attempt to maximize their profits by increasing the number of items for sale.” [6], [7]

This is because as the price goes higher producers will be more willing to provide more of their goods or services; every business exists to make profit and price increasing gives signal to producer to increase their price to make more profit therefore higher price is inducing producers to make more. [6]

We can easily find adequate metaphor even in the university to understand the concept of Law of Supply. If the wage paying to computer engineer increases, there will be more students will choose to study computer science. As well as in business, if the profitability of the product increases, the firm will decide to manufacture more goods. [6]

Formula 

This characteristic of supply can be expressed in mathematical formula in linear equation, shape of rightwards and upwards. It will look like this below:

'QxS = f(p)'

Where:

n  QxS = quantity supplied of commodity/good x by the producers
n  Px = price of commodity/good x
n  f =function of. 
For example, given that the linear equation is

Qs = -60 + 30P,

If the price(P) is zero, the quantity supplied will be negative number which indicates no supplier will be willing nor able to produce such product at a zero price. At a price of P=2, the quantity supplied will be zero which means producer will be willing and able to produce at a price higher than P=2. [9]

By combining this formula explaining the Law of Supply with another microeconomic concept called Law of Demand, we can induce the equilibrium price of certain market by using simultaneous equation.

For example, the equation for supply is

Qs = -60 + 30P [9]

And the equation for the demand is

Qd = 180 – 20P [9]

Equilibrium Price is where Qs is being equal to Qd, so the simultaneous equation will be look like:

Qs = Qd

Qs = -60 + 30P

Qd = 180 – 20P

-60 + 30P = 180 – 20P [9]

To solve the equation, by using transposition, put Ps at the left-hand side and other constants at the right-hand side, then it will be:

50P = 240/50p

P = 4.8 [9]

We can then obtain the knowledge that the equilibrium price of this specific good or service will be at price of 4.8

To be more specific, this means that the equilibrium price for the goods at the market is $4.00. If the producer lowers the price below $4.00, an excess in demand would cause the buyers to want more pineapples than the fruit stand can sell. If the supplier raises the price above $4.00, an excess in supply would cause buyers to want fewer pineapples than the fruit stand can sell. If the fruit stand keeps the price of their pineapples at $4.00, then there is a balance between supply and demand which is good for both the buyers and the fruit stand. [9]

]

Supply curve 

Law of supply can be depicted with graphs as well. (Source 3.1)

Graph above shows the concept of Law of Supply with shape of upward slopping linear graph showing if the price increases quantity supplied will increase together.

There are two types of movement of supply curve. First is the movement along the supply curve and second is the shift of the supply curve.

To explain the movement along the supply curve, simply it happens due to any price relative reasons.

This happens solely because of increase of price. This graph is showing when the price is increasing and as the price increases, this will give incentives to firms producing goods or services to produce more for greater profit. Initially, the price was at 80 and the firm was supplying 60 units, when the price had increased to 116, the firms conclude to make more units up to 70. [8]

Another change in supply curve is ‘shift’. In this case it does not move along the supply curve but the whole supply curve shifts to either left or right. This fundamentally happens because of any non-price determinants. [8]

In this case the supply curve shift to right, initially S1 to S2. The equilibrium price also decreases from the point of intersection of P1 and Q1 to another intersection of P2 and Q2, eventually the equilibrium price had been decreased.  [8]

In this case the supply curve shift to left, initially S1 to S2. The equilibrium price also increases from the point of intersection of P1 and Q1 to another intersection of P2 and Q2, eventually the equilibrium price had been increased.

Affecting factors 

There are various non-price determinants that occur shift in supply curve:

Cost of productions - If the cost that used in productions such as wage increases, the firms can produce more at the same price so the quantity supplied will increase and supply curve shifts to the right, vice versa. [8]

More firms - If number of suppliers increases, the quantity supplied will obviously increase together, vice versa. [8]

Capacity - If the number of factories producing the goods increase, the quantity supplied will increase, vice versa. [8]

Weather - For example, in the agriculture, the quantity supplied will be dependent on the weather and unfortunately, in case of natural disaster, the quantity supplied can be extremely less, vice versa. [8]

Productive workers - If the firm employs more well-educated workers, the productivity of the workers will increase and therefore the quantity supplied will naturally increase, vice versa. [8]

Technology improvement - As time goes, the technology will be better and better and will be able to either produce more at the same price or produce at a lower price, so the quantity supplied will increase with technological improvement. [8]

Government policy - If the government decided to give subsidies to encourage certain product, then the quantity supplied will increase as the firms are able to produce at a cost of production. [8] Additionally, if the government wants more tax from such products like cigarette, the cost of production will rise and therefore will produce less. [8]

Exceptions 

There can be exceptions for law of supply when there is prediction of the price will change in the future.

When there is an expectation that the price will fall in near future, producers will prefer to sell in lower price to stimulate demand to rise. For example, perishable goods such as milk, the expiration date is very short, and therefore its supply is less dependent on price, these perishable goods’ supply quantity rather depends on the nature of its product. [11]

Price Elasticity 

Quantity supplied by producer is decided by the price, if price goes up, more products are made, vice versa. Then the rate of increase in quantity supplied based on the change in price is Price Elasticity; how many quantities are produced more when unit price is increased. Equation describing the elasticity of supply will be: [12]

Price Elasticity of Supply (PES) : [12]

There are five categories to classify elasticity

1) Perfect Inelastic Supply (PES = 0)

If the good has perfect inelastic supply, it means no matter how much the price goes up and down, the quantity of the product always remains the same. Example can be anything that has finite quantity and cannot be produce more such as famous art piece or limited-edition shoes. [12]

2) Relatively Inelastic Supply (0 < PES < 1)

If the product has PES between 0 and 1, it means percentage change is price brings relatively smaller change of portion in quantity supplied. Example of this kind of products can be something that takes very long time to make it; if so, even the price goes up, producer will not be able to produce more right away easily such as nuclear power which requires construction, highly educated labours, long time etc. [12]

3) Unit Elastic Supply (PES = 1)

When the good has unit elastic supply, it means when the price increase to twice, quantity doubles as well. [12]

4) Relatively Elastic Supply (PES > 1)

Goods having relatively elastic supply means the quantity supplied is sensitive to the price. When producers can make the merchandises in a short time it usually has relatively elastic supply. For example, fidget spinner, when the market’s demand went higher, producers immediately increased their quantity supplied which is bigger than the percentage change is price. [12]

5) Perfectly Elastic Supply (PES = ∞  )

This one is very unrealistic case. Infinite elastic supply means even there is a small price change, quantity supplied will be disallow producers to produce. This cannot have a real-life example because if this is a case, seller will be willing and able to produce as much as the producer wants when the price is 10 dollars, but if the price changes into 10.01 or 9.99, producer will not be able and willing to produce at all and this is very unrealistic. [12]

Mathematical definition 
In non-differentiable terms, the law of supply can be expressed as:

where y is the amount that would be supplied at some price p, and y'  is the amount that would be supplied at some other price p' . Thus for example if p > p'  then y > y' .

See also

Demand curve
Law of demand
Supply (economics)
Supply and demand

References

[5] Kenton, W. (2021). Supply. Investopedia. Retrieved 3 April 2022, from https://www.investopedia.com/terms/s/supply.asp

[6] What Is the Law of Supply?. Investopedia. (2022). Retrieved 13 March 2022, from https://www.investopedia.com/terms/l/lawofsupply.asp

[7] What is Law Of Supply? Definition of Law Of Supply, Law Of Supply Meaning - The Economic Times. The Economic Times. (2022). Retrieved 13 March 2022, from https://economictimes.indiatimes.com/definition/law-of-supply

[8] Pettinger, T. (2019). Factors affecting Supply - Economics Help. Economics Help. Retrieved 13 March 2022, from https://www.economicshelp.org/microessays/equilibrium/supply/

[9] How To Calculate Equilibrium Price. Indeed Career Guide. (2021). Retrieved 13 March 2022, from https://www.indeed.com/career-advice/career-development/how-to-calculate-equilibrium-price#:~:text=You%20use%20the%20supply%20formula,price%20of%20hats%20in%20dollars

[10] Kenton, W. (2021). Supply Curve Definition. Investopedia. Retrieved 13 March 2022, from https://www.investopedia.com/terms/s/supply-curve.asp#:~:text=How%20a%20Supply%20Curve%20Works,(all%20else%20being%20equal

[11] Standard, B. What is Law of Supply? - Definition, Factors and Exceptions. Business Standard. Retrieved 17 May 2022, from https://www.business-standard.com/about/what-is-law-of-supply.

[12] Ross, S. (2022). How Does Price Elasticity Affect Supply?. Investopedia. Retrieved 17 May 2022, from https://www.investopedia.com/ask/answers/040615/how-does-price-elasticity-affect-supply.asp.

Supply
Economics laws